The Action of 29 June 1609 was an attack on Tunisian ships on 29 June 1609 by a combined fleet of 8 Spanish galleons and 3 smaller vessels, under Admiral Don Luis Fajardo, and a French squadron of 3 vessels, under Beaulieu. The raid was made at the Halq al-Wadi, northern Tunisia.

Ships involved

Allies
Spain (Fajardo)
San Francisco
Santa María Magdalena
Nuestra Señora de los Remedios
San Fulgencio
Nuestra Señora del Rosario
San Augustín
Nuestra Señora de Regla
Santa Margarita
Santa Ana (frigate)
Nuestra Señora de Buen Viaje (caravel)
San Juan Bautista ("canoa")

France (Beaulieu)
Lune/Maan 50
2 small

Tunisia
Some of the Tunisian ships names were given as Madaleyne 24, Perle (French), Comte Maurice 50, Faulcon (Portuguese), as well as 1 700-ton ship and 1 500-ton ship of 31 guns. The 16 real fighting ships and the galley had 435 guns total.

Casualties
Under cover of heavy fire the boats were sent in. They overcame the small parties of shipkeepers and fired one ship after another. Of 23 Tunisian sailing ships, 21 were burnt and 2 captured while one Algerian galley was also burnt.

Conflicts in 1609
Naval battles involving France
Naval battles involving Ottoman Tunisia
Naval battles involving Spain
1609 in France
1609 in the Ottoman Empire
1609 in Africa
17th century in Tunisia